IAFE or Iafe may refer to:
 7626 Iafe, an asteroid named after the Instituto de Astronomía y Física del Espacio
 The International Association of Financial Engineers
 Former name of the Instituto de Ferrocariles del Estado (IFE), the Venezuelan institution for railways.
 Instituto de Astronomía y Física del Espacio at the University of Buenos Aires
 The Institute for Advanced Financial Education
 The Rylsky Institute of Art Studies, Folklore and Ethnology in Kyiv, Ukraine